Donja Borina is a village in Serbia. It is situated in the Mali Zvornik municipality, in the Mačva District of Central Serbia. The village has a Serb ethnic majority and its population was 1,731 in 2002.

1948: 1,187
1953: 1,290
1961: 1,395
1971: 1,446
1981: 1,521
1991: 1,707
2002: 1,731

About village 

Donja Borina consists of two major settlements Batar and Andraca. For any of them they do not know exactly how they got the name. Batar is much more urban than Andraca, there is a church, primary school, post and cultural center, where is the local administration. 

Andraca is a part of the village where people are mostly deal with agriculture, limekiln and selling of timber. Other hamlets are: Dedinje, Stojanovici, Petkovici, Kikanovici, Pavlovici, Filipovici, Lepenica and Gucevo.

Popular Places 

Certainly the most attractive part of the village is located near the Drina river, along which there are two restaurants, an old and new Ribarski.

Better known is a new one which started in the 1976 and was an unavoidable stop for all those who have journeyed to the sea. His real name is the restaurant "Mladica" and got the name because there is the kind of fish Huchen and it is a real trophy to all fishermen. Old Ribarski was renovated in 2000 and now is a pizza restaurant "La Bella."

Other restaurants : "kod  Micuke", "kod Milisava", "kod Crnogorca", "Stella" and restaurant "Drinska stena"

References

See also
 Website Donja i Gornja Borina
List of places in Serbia

Populated places in Mačva District